Ethmia candidella is a moth in the family Depressariidae. It is found in North Africa, southern Europe and the Middle East.

The larvae of subspecies candidella feed on Lithospermum species (including Lithospermum purpurocaeruleum), Cerinthe major, Borago officinalis and Asperugo procumbens, while the larvae of subspecies wiltshirei have only been recorded on Asperugo procumbens.

Subspecies
Ethmia candidella candidella (Morocco, western Algeria, Spain, southern France, Switzerland, Italy, Austria, Hungary, Macedonia, S.Russia, Asia Minor, Syria, Palestine, Iraq, Transcaspia)
Ethmia candidella delicatella de Lattin, 1963 (Algeria, Tunisia)
Ethmia candidella wiltshirei de Lattin, 1963 (north-western Iran)
Ethmia candidella farinatella de Lattin, 1963 (Turkestan)

References

Moths described in 1908
candidella
Moths of Europe
Moths of Asia
Moths of Africa